The Intendancy of San Salvador was an administrative division of the Captaincy General of Guatemala, itself an administrative division of the Viceroyalty of New Spain which was a part of the Spanish Empire.

The intendancy was formed in 1785 as a part of the Bourbon Reforms and was formed along with the intendancies of Ciudad Real, Comayagua, and León. It was dissolved in 1821 following the signing of the Act of Independence of Central America on 15 September of that year that established the United Provinces of Central America, which San Salvador joined as a province.

Establishment 
Prior to 1785, the region of modern-day El Salvador was governed by the Greater Mayorship of San Salvador, a remnant of Habsburg rule in the area. During the Bourbon Reforms of the late 1700s, reformists sought to reorganize the relationship between the Spanish Crown and the colonies that made up the Spanish Empire by further centralizing governance of the colonies and taking away autonomy from wealthy elites, but the attempts at such reforms caused resistance among Creoles that began gaining influence in Spanish governance. As a part of the reform, the Intendancy of San Salvador was created, as were the intendancies of Ciudad Real, Comayagua, and León, which took away significant amounts of power and influence of the Captaincy General of Guatemala in the areas affected.

Governance 

When the mayorship was transformed into an intendancy in 1785, Mayor Manuel Fradique y Goyena remained in his position until 1786 when he was replaced by José Ortiz de la Peña as the first colonial intendant. He was replaced by Francisco Luis Héctor de Carondelet in 1789. During his tenure, indigo production decreased as a result of the reduction of the local indigenous population. He recruited Spanish laborers to do the work of the indigenous people, which later resulted in a significant increase of a lighter-skinned populace in northern El Salvador today, notably in the Chalatenango Department, who are the descendants of the laborers. He was considered the "best colonial intendant" of San Salvador during the intendancy.

In 1791, Carondelet became the governor of the Governate of Louisiana and was replaced by José Antonio María de Aguilar, who only served two years, and was replaced by Ignacio Santiago Ulloa in 1793. Ulloa died on 1 January 1798 and was succeeded by eight interim intendants from 1798 until 1805 when Antonio Gutiérrez y Ulloa was appointed as intendant.

Independence 

On 5 November 1811, the 1811 Independence Movement of San Salvador overthrew Gutiérrez y Ulloa and José Mariano Batres y Asturias replaced him as interim intendant. Batres y Asturias was replaced by Colonel José Alejandro de Aycinena on 3 December 1811. Aycinena suppressed remnants of the independence movement and resigned in 1812 in favor of José María Peinado y Pezonarte. Peinado y Pezonarte governed San Salvador until he was replaced by José Méndez de Quiroga during the 1814 Independence Movement. He was in office until 1817 when he was succeeded by two interim intendants: Juan Miguel de Bustamante, who served from 1817 to 1818, and Simón Gutiérrez, who only served in 1818.

Peinado y Pezonarte reassumed office in 1818 but died in office in 1819. He was succeeded by Pedro Barriere. On 15 September 1821, José Cecilio del Valle, José Matías Delgado, Gabino Gaínza, and other Central American leaders drafted and signed the Act of Independence of Central America in Guatemala City, declaring the independence of the Central American provinces of Guatemala, San Salvador, Honduras, Nicaragua, and Costa Rica from Spain and establishing the United Provinces of Central America. On 21 September 1821, the Intendancy of San Salvador accepted the declaration of independence and was dissolved; it became the Province of San Salvador, a part of the United Provinces of Central America, with Barriere as its political chief. He served as political chief until 28 November 1821.

Economy 
In 1782, the Spanish Crown reduced tariffs and fees obstructing trade between mainland Spain and the American colonies which greatly increased the imports and exports between Spain and its colonies. As a result, the economy and population of not only the Intendancy of San Salvador, but all of the colonies increased significantly. During Spanish rule, indigo was the intendancy's primary export that dominated the economy. Guatemala's power and economy were notably deprived, not only as a result of losing San Salvador in 1785, but also because the value of indigo exports it lost in the process were very significant.

Notes

References

Citations

Bibliography 

 
 
 
 
 
 
 
 

Colonial Central America
History of El Salvador
18th century in Central America
19th century in Central America
States and territories established in 1785
States and territories disestablished in 1821
1785 establishments in North America
1821 disestablishments in North America
1785 establishments in the Spanish Empire
1821 disestablishments in the Spanish Empire
El Salvador–Spain relations
Spanish-speaking countries and territories
Intendancies of the Spanish Empire